Martin Mazanec (born August 5, 1989) is a Czech professional ice hockey defenceman. He currently plays with EC Peiting in the Oberliga.

Mazanec made his Czech Extraliga debut playing with Piráti Chomutov debut during the 2013–14 Czech Extraliga season.

References

External links

1989 births
Living people
Czech ice hockey defencemen
AZ Havířov players
EC Peiting players
Les Aigles de Nice players
Milton Keynes Lightning players
Motor České Budějovice players
Piráti Chomutov players
IHC Písek players
Sportovní Klub Kadaň players
Sportspeople from České Budějovice
MsHK Žilina players
Czech expatriate ice hockey players in Germany
Czech expatriate ice hockey players in Slovakia
Czech expatriate sportspeople in Italy
Czech expatriate sportspeople in England
Czech expatriate sportspeople in France
Expatriate ice hockey players in England
Expatriate ice hockey players in Italy
Expatriate ice hockey players in France